Robert Detweiler (20 July 1930 – 8 December 2003) was an American competition rower and Olympic champion, naval officer, and scientist of solid state physics. He won a gold medal in coxed eights at the 1952 Summer Olympics, as a member of the American team.

After the Olympics, Detweiler became a member of the Church of Jesus Christ of Latter-day Saints.

References

External links 
 

1930 births
2003 deaths
American Latter Day Saints
Converts to Mormonism
Rowers at the 1952 Summer Olympics
Olympic gold medalists for the United States in rowing
20th-century American mathematicians
20th-century American physicists
English physicists
Theoretical physicists
American male rowers
Medalists at the 1952 Summer Olympics